Field Farm is a  nature preserve and farm in Williamstown, Massachusetts, managed by the Trustees of Reservations. An International Style house, built in 1948 by Edwin Goodell, is operated as a bed and breakfast inn. Also on the site is The Folly, a small guest house designed by Ulrich Franzen in 1966. The Folly is currently open for guided tours. The property also contains a sculpture garden. 

The property was donated to the Trustees in 1984 by Eleanore Bloedel, the widow of Lawrence Bloedel.  Lawrence Bloedel was the librarian of Williams College and a son of businessman Julius Bloedel.  Bloedel was a noted art collector.  Upon his death, his collection of 300 artworks was bequeathed to the Whitney Museum of American Art and to the Williams College Museum of Art.  Some of the artworks donated to Williams are on display at Field Farm, on loan to The Trustees.

References

External links 
 The Guest House at Field Farm The Trustees of Reservations
 Trail map
 Guest House reservation booking website

The Trustees of Reservations
Open space reserves of Massachusetts
Protected areas of Berkshire County, Massachusetts
Sculpture gardens, trails and parks in the United States
Williamstown, Massachusetts
Houses completed in 1948
Modernist architecture in Massachusetts
Historic house museums in Massachusetts
Museums in Berkshire County, Massachusetts
Protected areas established in 1984
1984 establishments in Massachusetts